Love Games is the first single from the first album of the English musical group Level 42. It was also their first single to break into the UK top 40, reaching no.38 in the spring of 1981 and resulted in their first appearance on Top of the Pops.

Tracks
Original Release:
UK (Polydor; POSP 234) Picture sleeve
Side A: 4:04 "Love Games" (Edit)
Side B: 4:36 "Forty-Two" (Edit)

Charts

Weekly charts

Year-end charts

References

1981 singles
Level 42 songs
Songs written by Mark King (musician)
Songs written by Phil Gould (musician)
1981 songs
Polydor Records singles